Clay Tanner (February 3, 1931 in Clay City, Indiana, USA as Allen Honaker – December 22, 2002 in Hernando, Florida, USA) was an American actor. He began his career with roles in various TV productions such as Bonanza, The Fugitive, Get Smart, Perry Mason, McHale's Navy, The Outer Limits, The Virginian, and Stoney Burke. Tanner also played the role of Satan in the rape scene of Rosemary's Baby.

Partial filmography
 1963 Stoney Burke (TV) as Russ
 1963 The Nutty Professor as Man (uncredited)
 1963 A Gathering of Eagles as Patient (uncredited)
 1963 The Outer Limits (TV) as Second Hunter
 1963 Alexander the Great (TV movie) as The Four Guardsmen
 1964-1965 Broadside (TV) as The Marine / The Chief / The Marine Sergeant
 1965 McHale's Navy Joins the Air Force as Lieutenant Wilson
 1965 Perry Mason as Officer
 1966 Get Smart (TV) as KAOS Agent #3
 1962-1966 McHale's Navy as The 1st MP / The Marine Guard / The 2nd Marine / The Guard
 1966 Seconds as Father (uncredited)
 1964-1966 The Virginian (TV) as Station Agent / Frank / Baggage Man / Station Master / Freight Agent
 1964-1967 The Fugitive (TV) - Policeman Landers / Deputy / 2nd Officer
 1967 Laredo (TV) as Abe
 1967 The Big Valley (TV) as Tanner
 1966-1967 Bonanza (TV) as DeWitt / "Tex" / Wiggins / Herb (six episodes)
 1968 Rosemary's Baby as The Devil (uncredited)
 1968 The Shakiest Gun in the West as Deputy (uncredited)
 1969 Hello, Dolly! as Laborer (uncredited)
 1970 The High Chaparral (TV) as Jesse
 1970 Night Chase (TV movie)
 1971 How to Frame a Figg as Motorcycle Officer
 1972 Lady Sings the Blues as The Detective #2
 1972 Hawaii Five-O episode: "Journey out of Limbo" as Stark
 1973 Cleopatra Jones as Cop in "Bust" (uncredited)
 1974 She Lives! (TV movie) as Police Officer
 1974 The Gravy Train as Bather
 1973-1974 Kung Fu (TV) as Sheriff Talley / Deputy Ty / Barr
 1975 Race with the Devil as Delbert
 1974-1975 Harry O (TV) as Deputy / Leon, the Bartender / Marshall Coffey
 1976 Cannon (TV) as Captain Middleman
 1976 W.C. Fields and Me as Assistant Director (uncredited)
 1976 Zebra Force as Lieutenant Claymore
 1976 The Outlaw Josey Wales as First Texas Ranger
 1976 A Small Town in Texas as Junior
 1976 Drum as Mr. Holcomb
 1976 Hollywood Man as Dave
 1976-1977 Starsky and Hutch (TV) as Fields / Conrad
 1977 Nowhere to Hide (TV movie) as Lee
 1977 Final Chapter: Walking Tall as O.Q. Teal
 1978 Thaddeus Rose and Eddie (TV movie) as Singer
 1978 Big Bob Johnson and His Fantastic Speed Circus as Earl
 1979 Mr. Horn (TV Movie) as Lieutenant Henry Lawton
 1985 Wildside (TV) as Grosset (final television appearance)

References

External links

1931 births
2002 deaths
American male film actors
American male television actors
Male actors from Indiana
20th-century American male actors